The 2022–23 PGA Tour of Australasia, titled as the 2022–23 ISPS Handa PGA Tour of Australasia for sponsorship reasons, is a series of men's professional golf events played mainly in Australia. The main tournaments on the PGA Tour of Australasia are played in the southern summer, so they are split between the first and last months of the year.

Schedule
The following table lists official events during the 2022–23 season.

Unofficial events
The following events were sanctioned by the PGA Tour of Australasia, but did not carry official money, nor were wins official.

Notes

References

External links

PGA Tour of Australasia
Australasia
Australasia
PGA Tour of Australasia
PGA Tour of Australasia
PGA Tour of Australasia
PGA Tour of Australasia
Australasia